Gogo arcuatus is a species of catfish of the family Anchariidae endemic to Madagascar where it is found in the Sandrananta River basin.  It grows to a length of 18.1 cm.

References 
 

Anchariidae
Taxa named by Heok Hee Ng
Taxa named by John Stephen Sparks
Fish described in 2005